The 2015 Belgian Cup Final, named Cofidis Cup after the sponsor, was the 60th Belgian Cup final and took place on 22 March 2015 between Club Brugge and Anderlecht. It was the first time the two giants of Belgian football met in the final since the 1993–94 Belgian Cup. The match finished in a dramatic way as Anderlecht looked to have taken the game to overtime through a last minute equalizer by Aleksandar Mitrović, cancelling out the earlier goal by Tom De Sutter, however in added time Lior Refaelov struck goal from outside the penalty area.

Route to the final

Match

Details

External links

Footnotes

Belgian Cup finals
Cup Final
Club Brugge KV matches
R.S.C. Anderlecht matches
March 2015 sports events in Europe
Sports competitions in Brussels
2015 in Brussels